Mittlerer Landweg is a station on the Berlin-Hamburg railway line and served by the trains of Hamburg S-Bahn lines S2 and S21. The station was originally opened in 1842 and is located in the Hamburg district of Billwerder, Germany. Billwerder is part of the Hamburg borough of Bergedorf.

History  
The station was opened by the Hamburg-Bergedorf Railway Company in 1842 to serve the commuter rail in Hamburg's south-eastern quarters. In 1958 Mittlerer Landweg station was electrified and integrated into the Hamburg S-Bahn network.

Service 
The lines S2 and S21 of Hamburg S-Bahn call at Mittlerer Landweg station. The travel time to Hamburg Hauptbahnhof takes about 14 minutes.

See also  

 Hamburger Verkehrsverbund (HVV)
 List of Hamburg S-Bahn stations

References

External links 

 Line and route network plans at hvv.de 

Hamburg S-Bahn stations
Buildings and structures in Bergedorf
Railway stations in Germany opened in 1842